Mikhail Vladimirovich Studenetsky (6 March 1934 – 1 March 2021) was a  Soviet basketball player.

Biography
Studenetsky was a point guard of the Soviet team between 1954 and 1959 and won a silver medal at the 1956 Summer Olympics, as well as the European titles in 1957 and 1959. After retirement he worked as an engineer.

He died on 1 March 2021, aged 86, five days short from his 87th birthday, from COVID-19 during the COVID-19 pandemic in Russia.

References

External links

1934 births
2021 deaths
Olympic basketball players of the Soviet Union
Basketball players at the 1956 Summer Olympics
Olympic silver medalists for the Soviet Union
FIBA EuroBasket-winning players
Soviet men's basketball players
Russian men's basketball players
Olympic medalists in basketball
Medalists at the 1956 Summer Olympics
Point guards
Basketball players from Moscow
Moscow State Textile University alumni
Deaths from the COVID-19 pandemic in Russia